Hydronebrius is a genus of beetles in the family Dytiscidae, containing the following species:

 Hydronebrius amplicollis Toledo, 1994
 Hydronebrius cordaticollis (Reitter, 1896)
 Hydronebrius kashmirensis (Vazirani, 1964)
 Hydronebrius mattheyi Brancucci, 1980

References

Dytiscidae